Mali competed at the 1984 Summer Olympics in Los Angeles, United States.

Results by event

Athletics

Men's Long Jump
 Abdoulaye Traoré
 Qualification — 6.92m (→ did not advance, 25th place)

References
Official Olympic Reports

Nations at the 1984 Summer Olympics
1984